George R. Newell House may refer to:

George R. Newell House (Orlando, Florida), formerly listed on the National Register of Historic Places in Orange County, Florida
George R. Newell House (Minneapolis, Minnesota), listed on the National Register of Historic Places in Hennepin County, Minnesota